Aethaea or Aithaia was a town of ancient Messenia, the inhabitants of which revolted from Sparta with the Thuriatae in 464 BCE.

Its site is unlocated.

References

Populated places in ancient Messenia
Former populated places in Greece
Lost ancient cities and towns